Máximo González and Fabrício Neis were the defending champions but chose not to defend their title.

Orlando Luz and Rafael Matos won the title after defeating James Cerretani and Fernando Romboli 6–3, 7–6(7–2) in the final.

Seeds

Draw

References

External links
 Main draw

Rio Tennis Classic - Doubles
2021 Doubles